Danny Huwé (1 December 1943 – ) was a Belgian journalist who was working for VTM, Vlaamse Televisie Maatschappij (English: Flemish Television Company), at the time of his death. Before VTM he worked as a radio journalist at the BRT (national radio and television) for many years together with journalists such as Rudi Dufour, Rudi Vranckx, Mark Ooms, and Piet Deslé. He was killed during the Romanian Revolution.

Biography
He was born in Geraardsbergen (Belgium), and killed on 24 or 25 December 1989 in Bucharest (Romania) during the Romanian Revolution. He was shot by a sniper thought to be loyal to Nicolae Ceaușescu. Huwé was travelling by car from Sofia, Bulgaria towards central Bucharest. His car was in the southwestern part of the city, in the Drumul Taberei neighborhood, when it was blocked by a tank. Border guards opened fire, hitting him in the head.

Legacy
The square where Huwé was killed has been named after him. The Danny Huwé Square (Piața Danny Huwé in Romanian) is located at the Răzoare traffic circle which is at the intersection of Timișoara Boulevard, Drumul Taberei Boulevard, and Progresului Street. Also, the bus stations in the area bear his name.

Huwé had one son, Tim, who was 18 years old at the time of his father’s death.

References

1943 births
1989 deaths
People from Geraardsbergen
Male journalists
Belgian television journalists
Belgian radio journalists
Flemish journalists
20th-century Belgian journalists
People of the Romanian Revolution
Deaths by firearm in Romania
Belgian people murdered abroad
Journalists killed in Romania
Journalists killed while covering military conflicts